Apotoforma epacticta is a species of moth of the family Tortricidae. It is found in Brazil (Mato Grosso).

The wingspan is 8–12 mm. The ground colour of the forewings is brownish cream, suffused with brownish and with a brown pattern.

References

Moths described in 1984
Tortricini
Moths of South America